Ali Isah Jita (born 15 July 1983), simply known as  Ali Jita. He is a Nigerian Hausa musician, singer and song writer.

Early life
Ali Jita was born into the family of Alhaji Sallau Jibrin Kibiya who is a butcher and his mother Hajiya Ummul-Khairi in Gyadi Gyadi area of Kumbotso local government Kano state, Nigeria. He was raised in the Shagari quarters of Gyadi Gyadi. As a little boy, his father moved his family from Kano to Lagos, then to Abuja due to his business purposes.

Education 
Ali Jita started his nursery/elementary education in Shagari Quarters. He then did his primary and junior secondary education at Bonikam Barracks, Victoria Island, Lagos state. He finished his senior secondary education in Abuja. He furthered his studies in Federal College of Education Kano where he obtained a National Diploma in Public administration. He also studied Computer Science at the Intersystem ICT School where he obtained a diploma.

Career 
Most of Ali jita's songs were used in the Kannywood film industry, but some of his albums were sold out to other Hausa film Industries. His associates include Nazifi Asnanic, Fati Niger, Naziru M Ahmad, etc. He also collaborated with Umar M Shareef and produced a song called Mama, his latest single is the song Kano produced in 2018. Ali Jita's song called Love was chosen the second best Hausa music of the year 2018 by BBC Hausa. Ali Jita uses Ingausa musical style, a combination of Hausa and English. He use the style to write and sing the song. In 2019 he produced the official video of Arewa angel together with another Kannywood actress Rahama Sadau, he also produce another official video of the song called Love with the actress Hadiza Gabon. He also organise a sallah celebration.

Discography

Albums

Awards and honors 
Ali  Jita has received many awards in his musical career,the awards are over 15 awards in counts, they are as follows:

See also
List of Nigerian musicians
List of Hausa people

References 

1983 births
21st-century Nigerian male actors
Hausa-language mass media
Living people
People from Kano
Male actors in Hausa cinema
Kannywood actors